Alan F. Smeaton MRIA is a researcher and academic at Dublin City University. He was founder of TRECVid, and the Centre for Digital Video Processing, and a winner of the University President's Research Award in Science and Engineering in 2002 and the DCU Educational Trust Leadership Award in 2009. Smeaton is a founding director of the Insight Centre for Data Analytics at Dublin City University (2013-2019). Prior to that he was a Principal Investigator and Deputy Director of CLARITY: Centre for Sensor Web Technologies (2008-2013). As of 2013, Smeaton was serving on the editorial board of the ACM Journal on Computers and Cultural Heritage, Information Processing and Management. Smeaton was elected a Member of the Royal Irish Academy in May 2013, becoming DCU's 10th member. In 2012 Smeaton was appointed by Minister Sean Sherlock to the board of the Irish Research Council.

Published works

Books by Alan Smeaton include:
 
 
 
 
Representative Papers by Alan Smeaton include:
 TRECVID: Benchmarking the Effectiveness of Information Retrieval Tasks on Digital Video, Alan Smeaton and Paul Over, in Proceedings of the Second International Conference on Image and Video Retrieval, CIVR 2003, Springer Lecture Notes in Computer Science, vol. LNCS2728, Springer, London, 2003.
 Evaluation Campaigns and TRECVID, Alan Smeaton, Paul Over, and Wessel Kraaij, in Proceedings of the Eight ACM International Workshop on Multimedia Information Retrieval, MIR 2006, ACM, 2006.

References

External links
 
 

Academics of Dublin City University
Living people
Members of the Royal Irish Academy
Irish scientists
Computer scientists
Year of birth missing (living people)